Clonoe O'Rahilly's GAC is a Gaelic Athletic Association club from Clonoe, County Tyrone, Northern Ireland .Their home ground is O'Rahilly Park which was opened in 1952.

History
Clonoe Gaelic Football Club was founded in 1916 and named after one of the Rebels in the 1916 Easter Rising. It was not until the 1940s that the Clonoe team became firmly established in Gaelic football. In 1941 Clonoe reached the Tyrone Senior Football Championship final for the first time and was beaten by Moortown St Malachy's. The 1950s was Clonoe's most successful decade, with the official opening of O'Rahilly Park in  1952 and a place in the County Finals in 1952, 1953, 1956, 1958 and 1959. In 1958 Clonoe defeated Carrickmore in the Final and the arrival of The O'Neill Cup at 'the Corner' became a reality. The 1960s were also successful for Clonoe with wins in 1960, 1961 and 1965. In 1973 the new  Social Club  was opened and a reserve team formed which won the Intermediate Championship in 1983.

Achievements
 Tyrone Senior Football Championship (8) 
 1958, 1959, 1960, 1964, 1965, 1991, 2008, 2013
 Tyrone Intermediate Football Championship 
 1976, 1979, 1983, 1995

References

External links 

http://www.tyronegaa.ie/club/club-locator/

Gaelic games clubs in County Tyrone
Gaelic football clubs in County Tyrone